Liars All is a 2013 American psychological thriller film. It was directed and written by Brian Brightly, and stars Matt Lanter, Sara Paxton, Gillian Zinser, and Torrance Coombs.

Plot

This psychological thriller finds a college group of friends playing Truth or Dare on New Year's Eve in London.  A pop singer, Casey, (Stephanie McIntosh) is dating Dennis, (Torrance Coombs) a ladies' man and soccer star.  Dennis' former girlfriend, Missy, (Gillian Zinser) is a psycho stalker.  Mike (Matt Lanter) loves Missy but she only sees him as a friend.  During the game we learn background about the players, like Mike and Katie (Sara Paxton) were first loves.

With booze, drugs, sex, video cameras, guns and untold relationships, the game gets out of control and Missy gets killed. At the police station, everyone tells their own different version of what happened.  Was the killing an accident, suicide, or murder?  The "who done it" has a surprise ending.

Cast
Matt Lanter as Mike
Sara Paxton as Katie
Gillian Zinser as Missy
Randy Wayne as Jack
Darin Brooks as Brax
Alice Evans as Sandra
Torrance Coombs as Dennis
Tiffany Mulheron as Angie
Stephanie McIntosh as Casey Kass
Henry Hereford as Constable Peter Franks

Production
Filming commenced on April 18, 2011 in Los Angeles. Matt Lanter revealed in a recent interview that his character, Mike, will be "pining after one girl (Gillian Zinser) and this other girl is pining after me (Sara Paxton) It’s like this whole web of desire. It always creates tension and drama."

Reception
On Rotten Tomatoes, a review aggregator the film holds a 22% liked it rating, with an average rating of 2.3/5 based on 216 user raters.

References

External links
 

2013 films
2013 psychological thriller films
American psychological thriller films
Films set in London
2010s English-language films
2010s American films